Clarkeulia perversa is a species of moth of the family Tortricidae. It is found in Paraná, Brazil.

References

Moths described in 1984
Clarkeulia
Moths of South America
Taxa named by Józef Razowski